Małgorzata Musierowicz (born January 9, 1945) is a popular Polish writer, author of many stories and novels for children and teenagers, but read with pleasure by adults too. She is the sister of poet and translator Stanisław Barańczak.

Life and career
Musierowicz was born in Poznań, Poland. She went to VII Liceum Ogólnokształcące im. Dąbrówki in Poznań. She graduated from the Art University in Poznań with an MFA degree in graphic design. She frequently contributes articles to a Polish opinion magazine, Tygodnik Powszechny. Her first book, "Małomówny i rodzina", was published in the mid-70s. She soon started to publish a series of humorous novels; the volumes are referred to as Jeżycjada. The name Jeżycjada derives from the name of a district in Poznań, Jeżyce where all her characters live. Musierowicz also wrote books for younger children. Her books "Kłamczucha", "Kwiat Kalafiora" and "Ida Sierpniowa" were adapted for films directed by Anna Sokolowska.

In 1982 her book Cauliflower flower was awarded The Christian Andersen Award. Her book Noelka has been entered on the Polish List of the International Board of Books for Young People (IBBY). In 2008 she got awarded the Medal of the Polish section by IBBY. Her novels have been translated into many languages, incl. for Czech, German, Swedish, Hungarian, and Japanese.

Books

Jeżycjada
1975 Małomówny i rodzina
1977 Szósta Klepka (The Sixth Stave)
1979 Kłamczucha (Liar)
1981 Kwiat kalafiora (The Flower of the Cauliflower)
1981 Ida Sierpniowa (August Ida)
1986 Opium w Rosole (Opium in Chicken Soup)
1988 Brulion Bebe B. (The Jotterbook of Bebe B.)
1992 Noelka
1993 Pulpecja
1993 Dziecko piątku (Friday's child)
1994 Nutria i Nerwus (Nutria and Nerwus)
1996 Córka Robrojka (Robrojek's daughter)
1998 Imieniny (Name Day)
1999 Tygrys i Róża (Tiger and Rose)
2002 Kalamburka
2004 Język Trolli (Trolla's language)
2005 Żaba (The Frog)
2006 Czarna polewka (Duck Blood Soup)
2008 Sprężyna (Driving Force)
2012 McDusia
2014 Wnuczka do Orzechów (Granddaughter of Walnuts)
2015 Feblik
2018 Ciotka Zgryzotka (Aunt Anguish)

Bambolandia
1978 Czerwony helikopter (Red helicopter)
1982 Ble-ble
1985 Kluczyk
1989 Światełko

"Poczytaj mi mamo" series
Co mam (What I Have)
Rybka (Little fish)
Bijacz (Beater)
Boję się (I am scared)
Kredki (Crayons)
Kurczak  (Chicken)
Znajomi z zerówki (Kindergarten Friends)
Hihopter
Tempusek
1990 Kluseczki (Dumplings)

Other books
Łasuch literacki
Tym razem serio
Całuski pani Darling (Mrs. Darling's Kisses)
1997 Frywolitki, czyli ostatnio przeczytałam książkę!
2000 Frywolitki 2, czyli ostatnio przeczytałam książkę!
2005 Frywolitki 3
2007 Na Gwiazdkę
2008 Dla Zakochanych (For People In Love)

There have been also many books and articles written about Musierowicz and her books.

References

External links
 Official web site of Malgorzata Musierowicz
 Fanpage of Jeżycjada series
 

1945 births
20th-century Polish novelists
20th-century Polish women writers
21st-century Polish novelists
21st-century Polish women writers
Living people
Polish children's writers
Polish women children's writers
Polish women novelists
Writers from Poznań